He Yong may refer to:

 He Yong (Han Dynasty) (206–220), Chinese official in Han Dynasty
 He Yong (politician) (born 1940), official of the Communist Party of China
 He Yong (rock musician) (born 1969), Chinese rock singer